Sammie 'Big Sam' Williams is a trombonist and band leader from New Orleans, Louisiana. He has been a member of the Dirty Dozen Brass Band and leads Big Sam's Funky Nation.

Career

In his youth, he studied with saxophonist Kidd Jordan and at New Orleans Center for Creative Arts. In his teens, Williams was a founding member of the Stooges Brass Band and joined the Dirty Dozen, allowing him to play with Karl Denson, Dave Matthews, Widespread Panic, and James Brown.  After one year with the Dirty Dozen, he began a side project broadening his musical ambitions. In 2006, he played with Elvis Costello and Allen Toussaint on their album The River in Reverse and tour.

Big Sam's Funky Nation became his main band, which performed at Bonnaroo, Gathering of the Vibes, New Orleans Jazz & Heritage Festival, Voodoo Music Experience, South By Southwest, and on the television show Austin City Limits.  Big Sam's Funky Nation is primarily a funk and rock band that has elements of traditional jazz, contemporary jazz, acid jazz, dance, hard rock, and punk.

Williams is interviewed on screen and appears in performance footage in the 2005 documentary film Make It Funky!, which presents a history of New Orleans music and its influence on rhythm and blues, rock and roll, funk and jazz. In the film, Big Sam's Funky Nation performs "Bah Duey Duey" with guest Troy Andrews.

Williams had a recurring role in the HBO series Treme. The series followed residents of New Orleans as they tried to rebuild their lives after Hurricane Katrina.

Williams proposed to his wife on stage at the New Orleans Jazz & Heritage Festival on May 4, 2014. In 2014 he played on the Durango Blues Train with other blues artists.

Awards and honors
 2003 OffBeat Awards, Best Emerging Band
 2005 Big Easy Award, Best Funk Band
 2006 Offbeat Awards, Best Funk/R&B Band
 2009 Big Easy Music Award, Best Funk Band of 2008
 2009 Jam Cruise Golden Mic Award
 2009 Louisiana Division of the Arts Fellowship
 2009 Where Y' at magazine, Best of the Big Easy's Reader's Pick: Best R&B Band
 2011 Jam Cruise 9 Golden Mic Award
 2012 Jam Cruise 10 Golden Mic Award
 2014 Big Easy Awards, Best Rock Album
 2016 Where Y' at magazine, Best New Orleans Band

Discography

 Birth of a Nation (2003)
 Take Me Back (2006)
 Peace Love & Understanding (2008)
 King of the Party (HyperSoul, 2010)
 Funky Donkey (2012)
 Evolution (2014)
 Feet on the Floor (2015)
 Songs in the Key of Funk, Vol. One (2018)
 No More Shakes (2020)

References
 "Big Sam's Funky Nation", Christopher Blagg, OffBeat magazine
 "Review of Take Me Back", Robert Fontenot, OffBeat magazine
 "Big Sam's Funky Nation", Kalen Marie Grant, SmoothVibes.com, September 19, 2006
 "We Love Music: Big Sam's Funky Nation", by Rachel Levitin, We Love DC

Specific

External links
Official site

American jazz trombonists
Male trombonists
Jazz musicians from New Orleans
Jazz-funk trombonists
Year of birth missing (living people)
Living people
Dirty Dozen Brass Band members
21st-century trombonists
21st-century American male musicians
American male jazz musicians